Charax (Χάραξ) may refer to:
 Charax, alternate name of Acharaca, an ancient oracle site in Lydia, Anatolia
 Charax, alternate name of Charakipolis, an ancient town in Lydia, Anatolia
 Charax, alternate name of Tralles, an ancient city in Lydia, Anatolia
 Charax (Corsica), ancient site in Corsica
 Charax (Lesser Armenia), ancient site in Lesser Armenia (now in Turkey)
 Charax (Media Atropatene), ancient site in Media Atropatene (now in Iran)
 Charax (Pontus), town of ancient Pontus (now in Turkey)
 Charax (Thessaly), ancient site in Thessaly, Greece
 Charax Alexandri, ancient site in Phrygia, Anatolia
 Charax, Crimea, the largest Roman military settlement excavated in the Crimea
 Charax Spasinu, an ancient port at the head of the Persian Gulf
 Charax Sidae or Anthemusias, an ancient Mesopotamian town Seleucia in Mesopotamia
 Charax, Rhagiana, a Seleucid and Parthian city in the province of Rhagiana, in the area nearby modern-day Rey
 Charax, Bithynia, an ancient Greek town in Turkey and possible location of the death of Constantine the Great
 Cape Charax, or possibly Cape Lithinon, a promontory at the southernmost point of the island of Crete
 Charax (fish), a genus of fish in the family Characidae